Chilla or Chilla-nashini is a Sufi practice of penance and solitude.

Chilla may also refer to:

Music 
 Chilla katna, in Hindustani classical music, a stage of training
Chillaa, a 2012 album by Robin

Places
 Chilla (Rajaji National Park), a wilderness area in India
 Chilla, Punjab, a village in India
 Chilla Canton, Ecuador

People
 Chilla Bulbeck (born 1951), Australian academic
 Chilla Christ (1911–1998), Australian cricketer
 Chilla Jones (born 1987), American battle rapper
 Chilla Porter (1936–2020), Australian athlete and politician
 Chilla Wilson (1931–2016), Australian rugby union footballer
 Mercedes Chilla (born 1980), Spanish javelin thrower

Other uses 
 Chilla (month), the fifth month of the Nepal Era calendar

 South American gray fox or chilla

See also
 Chila (disambiguation)